Palomo is a Spanish and Italian surname. Notable people with the surname include:

Ana Belén Palomo (born 1977), freestyle swimmer from Spain
Eduardo Palomo (1962-2003), Mexican actor
Tony Palomo (1931-2013), Guamanian historian and politician
Lorenzo Palomo (born 1938), Spanish composer
Victor Palomo, Spanish Grand Prix motorcycle racing driver in the 1970s
Florencio Palomo Valencia, Governor of Yucatán (1936–1938)
Elena Huelva Palomo, Spanish cancer activist and writer (2002–2023)
Víctor Mena Palomo, Governor of Yucatán (1953–1958)

Spanish-language surnames
Italian-language surnames